Chat Avenue is a web site that hosts chat rooms. A total of 20 chat rooms are available. Originally launched with DigiChat software based on Java, it was subsequently changed and built with 123 Flash Chat, an Adobe Flash-based software for in-browser chat rooms in October 2005.  In 2018, new PHP software was added to the website due to browser restrictions and the upcoming end-of-life announcement by Flash. In 2021, new chat software was added enabling user support of a webcam. The chat rooms are administered by volunteer moderators and administrators.

Use of platform by law enforcement

Some chat rooms within the site, which target younger audiences, are known to be used by law enforcement to catch online predators.

On September 18, 2018, New Jersey Attorney General Gurbir Grewal announced the arrests of 24 alleged child predators in “Operation Open House,” a multi-agency undercover operation targeting men who allegedly were using social media in an attempt to lure underage girls and boys for sexual activity.  Chat Avenue was among the social media and messaging apps named to have allegedly been used by the child predators.

In February 2021, Channel 4 released a television series documenting a specialist covert police unit tracking sexual predators online.  Chat Avenue was one of the platforms used by the police officers and was featured abundantly in the first episode of the series.

See also

List of chat websites
Online chat

References

External links 
Official Site

Online chat